Sweet Hollow Creek is a stream in Laclede County in the Ozarks of southern Missouri. The stream source area lies just west of Eldridge and it flows generally west to enter an entrenched meander of the Niangua River at Blue Spring.

Sweet Hollow Creek has the name of A. N. Sweet, a pioneer settler.

See also
List of rivers of Missouri

References

Rivers of Laclede County, Missouri
Rivers of Missouri